Albert George "Bob" Poke (16 February 1906 – 4 January 1989) was an Australian politician. Born in Somerset, Tasmania, he was educated at state schools before becoming an engine driver and timber worker. He was also Secretary of the Timberworkers' Union. In 1955, he was elected to the Australian Senate as a Labor Senator for Tasmania. He held the seat until his retirement in 1974.

Poke died in 1989, aged 82.

References

Australian Labor Party members of the Parliament of Australia
Members of the Australian Senate for Tasmania
Members of the Australian Senate
1906 births
1989 deaths
20th-century Australian politicians